The dotted-line robust slider or West Coast line-spotted lerista (Lerista lineopunctulata)  is a species of skink found in Western Australia.

References

Lerista
Reptiles described in 1839
Taxa named by André Marie Constant Duméril
Taxa named by Gabriel Bibron